Sarı Süleyman Bey ("Süleyman Bey the Blond",  1643) was an Ottoman Kurdish governor, the chief of the Mahmudis (a Kurdish tribe) under the Ottoman regime, who strengthened the Hoşap Castle in the Lake Van region.

References

Governors of the Ottoman Empire
17th-century people from the Ottoman Empire
Kurdish people from the Ottoman Empire
17th-century Kurdish people